Players born on or after 1 January 1983 were eligible to participate in the tournament. Players' age as of 21 July 2002 – the tournament's opening day. Players in bold have later been capped at full international level.

Group A

Head Coach :  Josef Krejča

Head couch :  Bjørn Hansen

Head Coach :  Peter Polák

Head Coach :  Iñaki Sáez

Group B

Head Coach :  Marc Van Geersom

Head Coach:  Martin Hunter

Head Coach:  Uli Stielike

Head Coach :  Brian Kerr

Footnotes

UEFA European Under-19 Championship squads
Squads